Větřkovice is a municipality and village in Opava District in the Moravian-Silesian Region of the Czech Republic. It has about 800 inhabitants.

Administrative parts
The hamlet of Nové Vrbno is an administrative part of Větřkovice.

History
Větřkovice was founded in 1298 and belongs among the few settlements that have preserved the foundation charter.

References

External links

Villages in Opava District